Empress Xiao may refer to:

Empresses with the surname Xiao 蕭
Empress Xiao (Sui dynasty) (566–648), empress consort of the Sui dynasty
Xiao Wen (蕭溫, died 936), married to Emperor Taizong of Liao
Xiao Sagezhi (蕭撒葛只, died 951), married to Emperor Shizong of Liao
Empress Xiao, married to Emperor Muzong of Liao
Xiao Yanyan (蕭燕燕, 953–1009), married to Emperor Jingzong of Liao
Empress Xiao (deposed, personal information unknown) Emperor Shengzong of Liao's first empress
Xiao Pusage (蕭菩薩哥) (983–1032), Emperor Shengzong of Liao's second empress
Xiao Sanqian (蕭三蒨), Emperor Xingzong of Liao's first empress
Xiao Tali (蕭撻裏, died 1076), Emperor Xingzong of Liao's second empress
Xiao Guanyin (蕭觀音, 1040–1075), Emperor Daozong of Liao's first empress
Xiao Tansi (蕭坦思, died 1118), Emperor Daozong of Liao's second empress
Xiao Duolilan (蕭奪裏懶), married to Emperor Tianzuo of Liao
Empress Xiao, Yelü Dashi's first empress
Xiao Tabuyan (蕭塔不煙), Yelü Dashi's second empress
Empress Xiao, married to Yelü Zhilugu, emperor of Qara Khitai

Filial Empress 孝皇后
Yu Daolian (died 366), Jin dynasty empress, posthumously known as Empress Xiao

See also
Empress Dowager Xiao (disambiguation)

Xiao